Donald Earle Clement (March 29, 1929 – December 12, 1993) was an American ice hockey announcer.

Earle, who got his start broadcasting high school hockey games on radio, called Boston Bruins games on WSBK-TV from 1967–1971.

From 1971–1977, Earle served as a second play by play announcer/analyst with the Philadelphia Flyers on WTAF alongside Gene Hart.

Most of Earle's career was spent with various New England radio stations, including WAAB, WOKW, and WKOX but he also worked in St. Petersburg, Florida, New York City, and at Philadelphia's WCAU.  He also was the sports director at WGGB-TV, Channel 40 in Springfield, Massachusetts.  He died in the Springfield suburb of Westfield.

References

External links
 Bruins' Fourth Stanley Cup win celebration, with Don Earle interviewing Bruins team members (starting at 1:15 into the video)

1930 births
1993 deaths
National Hockey League broadcasters
Boston Bruins announcers
Philadelphia Flyers announcers
Sports in Philadelphia
Colorado Rockies (NHL) announcers
North American Soccer League (1968–1984) commentators